Svenum Jensen Vævestad  (6 April 1849 – 21 June 1898) was a Norwegian  farmer and politician for the Liberal Party.

Vævestad was born and raised on Vevestad, a family farm in the parish of Gjerstad in Aust-Agder, Norway. He was a member of the council board in Gjerstad (1882-1897) and was council treasurer (1893-1897). He was elected to the Norwegian Parliament in 1897, representing the constituency of Nedenes Amt (now Aust-Agder).  He only served one term.

References

1849 births
1898 deaths
Members of the Storting
Aust-Agder politicians
Liberal Party (Norway) politicians
Norwegian farmers